The Hotel Brussels is a four-star hotel in the Louise/Louiza district of Brussels, Belgium, owned and managed by the Swedish hotel group Pandox AB. A landmark building, it originally opened as the Brussels Hilton in 1969. Pandox AB purchased the building in September 2010, assumed management in February 2011 and commenced a complete renovation of the 27 floors. The renovations were completed after a two-year period.

The hotel is located on the /, between the / and the Namur Gate, and next to the Egmont Palace. This area is served by the metro stations Louise/Louiza and Porte de Namur/Naamsepoort (on lines 2 and 6), as well as the tram stop / (on lines 8 and 92). .

History
The hotel was built in the 1960s on the / in Brussels, a shopping area running from the / to the Namur Gate. It was one of the first international hotels to be built in the city. At that time, the buildings along the Boulevard de Waterloo were all in neo-Rococo, neoclassical or neo-Renaissance styles.  The hotel building, however, caused a rupture with those styles being a massive tower containing 27 floors. The architect agency that designed the building was Montois Partners Architects, an agency located in Brussels.

The  hotel is the highest public viewpoint in Brussels. The building is one of the most widely recognised high-rise buildings on Brussels' skyline. When city officials decided that for the long-term tall buildings should disappear in Brussels, they opted not to include the hotel on the list with buildings to be removed. This decision proves that the building has become a landmark, and a part of Brussels' city centre.

In March 2014, U.S. President Barack Obama and his entourage rented a total of 283 rooms of this and another hotel in Brussels (Crowne Plaza) during a single overnight visit to the city, with the president staying at The Hotel Brussels.

Features
The hotel has 421 rooms and 18 suites. Facilities include a restaurant, a bar, an executive lounge, meeting rooms, a spa and a fitness.

Until September 2013 the hotel is to be fully redecorated by GCA Arquitectos Asociados, a Spanish architect bureau.

See also
 Architecture of Belgium
 Lists of hotels

References

Notes

External links

 

Astoria
City of Brussels
Buildings and structures in Brussels
Hotel buildings completed in 1969
Hotels established in 2011
Skyscraper hotels
Belgian companies established in 2011